Beaver Run (also known as Beaver Dam Run) is a tributary of Little Muncy Creek in Sullivan County and Lycoming County, in Pennsylvania, in the United States. The stream is dammed by the Beaver Lake Dam and a number of bridges have been constructed across it. Beaver Run has one named tributary, which is known as Marsh Run.

Course

Beaver Run begins in the North Mountain region in Davidson Township, Sullivan County. It flows west-northwest for more than a mile, crossing Pennsylvania Route 42, reaching the base of the mountain, and entering a valley. The stream then turns south-southwest for several tenths of a mile before passing through two wetlands and three ponds and entering Beaver Lake. In Beaver Lake, it enters Penn Township, Lycoming County and from the southern end of the lake, the stream turns south-southwest for several tenths of a mile, flowing past Bad Hill. It then turns south-southeast for more than a mile before receiving its only named tributary, Marsh Run, from the left and turning south. Several tenths of a mile further downstream, it enters Franklin Township and continues flowing south for a few tenths of a mile before turning south-southwest for more than a mile. The stream's valley then widens and it turns southwest for several tenths of a mile before reaching its confluence with Little Muncy Creek.

Tributaries
Beaver Run has one named tributary, which is known as Marsh Run.

Geography and geology
Most of the lake is in Penn Township, Lycoming County, but a portion is in Davidson Township, Sullivan County.

Wisconsinan Outwash, which consists of stratified sand and gravel, forms terraces along the flank of the valley of Beaver Run. Alluvium also occurs in the surficial geology in the vicinity of the stream, as does Wisconsinan Bouldery Till and a patch of Wisconsinan Ice-Contact Stratified Drift. Further upstream, there is Wisconsinan Till, alluvial fan, and a lake. Bedrock consisting of sandstone and shale occurs in the surficial geology near the stream's valley throughout much of its length.

Uranium has been observed in sedimentary rocks at the bottom of a bluff on the west side of Beaver Run. The stream's valley, which runs north-to-south (parallel to the glaciers during the Ice Age), has been significantly deepened by glacial scour.

Hydrology and watershed
The mouth of the stream is in the United States Geological Survey quadrangle of Lairdsville. However, its source is in the quadrangle of Sonestown. Its mouth is within  of Lairdsville.

A dam known as the Beaver Lake Dam is on Beaver Run. The dam is an earthfill dam with a vertical wall of concrete for an upstream slope.

The impairment is related to agricultural activity.

History
Beaver Run was entered into the Geographic Names Information System on August 2, 1979. Its identifier in the Geographic Names Information System is 1192109. The stream is also known as Beaver Dam Run. This variant name appears in the 1880 book The Geology of Lycoming County by Andrew Sherwood and Franklin Platt.

Historically, there were copper works on Beaver Run. In the early 1800s, the stream was classified by law as a public highway between the mouth and these copper works.

A concrete stringer/multi-beam or girder bridge carrying T-708 over Beaver Run was built in 1920 and repaired in 1968.

See also
Big Run (Little Muncy Creek), next tributary of Little Muncy Creek going downstream
Little Indian Run (Little Muncy Creek), next tributary of Little Muncy Creek going upstream
List of rivers of Pennsylvania

References

Rivers of Sullivan County, Pennsylvania
Rivers of Lycoming County, Pennsylvania
Tributaries of Muncy Creek
Rivers of Pennsylvania